The Australian State Netball League was Australia's premier netball league before the era of the Commonwealth Bank Trophy. The league is currently running as the State Champs, but now with more regions. The big league ran from 1993 until 1996. It included all six states and the Northern Territory.

Teams 
 New South Wales
 Northern Territory
 Queensland
 South Australia
 Tasmania
 Victoria
 Western Australia

History 

1993
 Champion: Victoria 
 Finalist: New South Wales
 3rd: Queensland 
 4th: South Australia 
 5th West Australia 
 6th Tasmania 
 7th Northern Territory 
 Largest Crowd: 5300 (Melbourne) 
 Biggest Victory: New South Wales defeated  Northern Territory 64-30 
 Most Valuable Player: Nicole Cussack (New South Wales)
 Best Shooting: Vicki Wilson (Queensland)
 Best Defence record: victoria

1994
 Champion: New South Wales 
 Finalist: Victoria 
 3rd: Queensland 
 4th: South Australia
 5th: Western Australia
 6th: Northern Territory 
 7th: Tasmania 
 Largest Crowd: 6000 (Melbourne) 
 Biggest Victory: Victoria def Tasmania 70-31
 Most Valuable Player: Shelley O'Donnell (Victoria)
 Best Shooting: Shelley O'Donnell (Victoria) 
 Best Defence: New South Wales

1995
 Champion: South Australia 
 Finalist: New South Wales 
 3rd: Victoria 
 4th: Western Australia 
 5th: Queensland 
 6th: Tasmania 
 7th: Northern Territory 
 Largest Crowd: Sydney (5900)
 Biggest Victory: South Australia def Northern Territory 69-20, South Australia def Tasmania 70-21 
 Most Valuable Player: Liz Ellis New South Wales
 Best Shooting: Vicki Wilson
 Best Defence: Victoria

1996 
 Champion: Victoria 
 Finalist: New South Wales 
 3rd: Western Australia 
 4th: Queensland 
 5th: Northern Territory
 6th: South Australia 
 7th: Tasmania 
 Largest Crowd: Melbourne (6300) 
 Biggest Victory: West Australia def Tasmania 72-30, Victoria def Tasmania 74-32, Northern Territory def Tasmania 59-17 
 Most Valuable Player: Vicki Wilson (Queensland)
 Best Shooting: Vicki Wilson
 Best Defence record: Northern Territory

1993 establishments in Australia
1998 disestablishments in Australia
Sports leagues established in 1993
Defunct netball leagues in Australia